Cedric Lee Juan Tuck, known mostly by his stage name Big Tuck, is an American rapper from Dallas, Texas He is a member of the Dallas rap group Dirty South Rydaz.

Biography
Tuck was born on March 29, 1979. He grew up in the Queen City neighborhood of South Dallas, where he attended Lincoln High School, and studied music at the University of Arkansas at Pine Bluff.

After dropping out of college, Tuck returned to South Dallas and begin performing rap music. He joined a seven piece band Dirty South Rydaz and recorded a successful independent solo album, Purple Hulk, in 2004 that led to Big Tuck and Dirty South Rydaz being signed by Universal in November 2005. In 2006, he released the album, Tha Absolute Truth, which featured Erykah Badu, Chamillionaire and Paul Wall. The album peaked at no.27 on the Billboard Top R&B/Hip-Hop Albums chart, and at no.14 on the Billboard Top Rap Albums chart.

Discography

Albums

Mixtapes

Singles

Chart positions

References

African-American male rappers
American male rappers
Living people
University of Arkansas at Pine Bluff alumni
1979 births
Rappers from Dallas
21st-century American rappers
21st-century American male musicians
21st-century African-American musicians
20th-century African-American people